Molecules and Cells is a peer-reviewed open access scientific journal of molecular and cellular biology. It was established in 1990 as the official publication of the Korean Society for Molecular and Cellular Biology, and is currently edited by Rho Hyun Seong (Seoul National University). From 1992–2013, the journal was published by Springer, but as of 2014 is published by the Society directly on a monthly basis.

Abstracting and indexing
The journal is abstracted and indexed in bibliographic databases:

External links

Open access journals
English-language journals
Biology journals
Publications established in 1990
Monthly journals